Pterolophia leiopodina is a species of beetle in the family Cerambycidae. It was described by Henry Walter Bates in 1873.

Subspecies
 Pterolophia leiopodina oshimanensis Breuning, 1969
 Pterolophia leiopodina leiopodina (Bates, 1873)

References

leiopodina
Beetles described in 1873